Samuel Satoru Kong is a Democratic member of the Hawaii House of Representatives, representing the 33rd district. Before entering the legislature he served in the United States Air Force and operated a florist shop and cab company.

References

Year of birth missing (living people)
Living people
Military personnel from Hawaii
American military personnel of Japanese descent
Businesspeople from Hawaii
Democratic Party members of the Hawaii House of Representatives
21st-century American politicians
Hawaii politicians of Japanese descent